The Spokane Spartans are a retired senior men’s ice hockey team from Spokane, Washington. They played in the Western International Hockey League for two seasons, between 1946-47 and 1947-48.

Coached by Rene Morin and Joe Benoit, the Spartans played a total of 40 games during their two seasons in the WIHL, compiling a record of 10 wins and 30 losses.

The Spartans were replaced in the 1948-49 season by the Spokane Flyers.

1946-47 roster
The Spartan’s 1946-47 roster included Al LaFace (goalie); Jack McLeod and Lorne Nadeau (defense); Bob Proulx (centre); and George Edwards and Bill Haldane (wingers).

Notable players
Reg Bentley

References

Ice hockey teams in Washington (state)
Sports in Spokane, Washington
Western International Hockey League teams
1946 establishments in Washington (state)
1948 disestablishments in Washington (state)
Ice hockey clubs established in 1946
Sports clubs disestablished in 1948